Franz Schädler may refer to:

 Franz Schädler (footballer) (born 1968), former Liechtenstein football midfielder
 Franz Schädler (alpine skier) (born 1917), Liechtenstein former alpine skier